Stiff may refer to:

 Stiff, a human corpse
 Stiffness, a material's resistance to bending
 Stiff (novel), a novel by Shane Maloney in his Murray Whelan series
 Stiff (film), an Australian TV movie based on the novel
 Stiff (professional wrestling), how a wrestler attacks an opponent
 Stiff: The Curious Lives of Human Cadavers, a book by Mary Roach
 Stiff Records, a British record label
 Seattle's True Independent Film Festival (STIFF), an annual event
 Jimmy Stiff, former member of American rock band Jackyl
 Stiff (album), by White Denim.

See also
 Stiff diagram, in hydrogeology and geochemistry, a way of displaying water chemistry data
 Stiff equation, an ordinary differential equation that exhibits behaviour at two widely different scales